Events in the year 1904 in Brazil.

Incumbents

Federal government
President: Francisco de Paula Rodrigues Alves 
Vice President: Francisco Silviano de Almeida Brandão

Governors 
 Alagoas: Joaquim Paulo Vieira Malta
 Amazonas: Silvério José Néri (till 23 July); Antônio Constantino Néri (from 23 July)
 Bahia: Severino Vieira, then José Marcelino de Sousa
 Ceará: Pedro Augusto Borges (till 12 July); Antônio Nogueira Accioli (from 12 July)
 Goiás: José Xavier de Almeida
 Maranhão: Manuel Lopes da Cunha
 Mato Grosso: Antônio Pais de Barros
 Minas Gerais: Francisco Salles
 Pará: Augusto Montenegro
 Paraíba: José Peregrino de Araújo (till 22 October); Álvaro Lopes Machado (from 22 October)
 Paraná: Francisco Xavier da Silva; Vicente Machado da Silva Lima
 Pernambuco: Antônio Gonçalves Ferreira (till 7 April); Sigismundo Antônio Gonçalves (from 7 April)
 Piauí: Arlindo Francisco Nogueira (till 1 July); Álvaro de Assis Osório Mendes (from 1 July)
 Rio Grande do Norte: Alberto Maranhão (till 25 March); Augusto Tavares Lira (from 25 March)
 Rio Grande do Sul: Antônio Augusto Borges de Medeiros
 Santa Catarina:
 São Paulo: 
 Sergipe:

Vice governors 
 Rio Grande do Norte:
 São Paulo:

Events
17 April - Bangu Atlético Clube is founded at the Fábrica Bangu in Rio de Janeiro.
14 December - The National Congress of Brazil approves a large naval acquisition programme.
date unknown
The Evangelical Lutheran Church of Brazil is founded in Rio Grande do Sul.
Ford begin selling cars in Brazil.

Births
3 January - Carlos Nascimento, football manager (died 1979)
7 October - Carlota De Camargo Nascimento (Loty), sculptor and poet (died 1974)
2 November - Armando Del Debbio, footballer (died 1984)
3 December - Roberto Marinho, publisher, businessman and TV and radio mogul (died 2003)

Deaths
10 September - Aparicio Saravia, Uruguayan politician and military leader (born 1856), of wounds received in the Battle of Masoller.
20 October - Carolina Novais, wife of the writer Joaquim Maria Machado de Assis, after thirty-five years of “perfect married life”.

References

See also 
1904 in Brazilian football

 
1900s in Brazil
Years of the 20th century in Brazil
Brazil
Brazil